Tonestus, common name serpentweed, is a genus of North American flowering plants in the family Asteraceae.

The name is an anagram of the name of the related genus Stenotus. Nestotus is similarly another anagram of the same name.

 Species
 Tonestus eximius (H.M.Hall) A.Nelson & J.F.Macbr. - CA NV 
 Tonestus graniticus (Tiehm & L.M.Shultz) G.L.Nesom & D.R.Morgan - NV 
 Tonestus lyallii  (A.Gray) A.Nelson - Alberta, British Columbia, WA OR ID MT CO WY NV CA
 Tonestus pygmaeus (Torr. & A.Gray) A.Nelson - MT WY CO NM

 formerly included 
now in Herrickia Lorandersonia Toiyabea 
 Tonestus alpinus (L.C.Anderson & Goodrich) G.L.Nesom & D.R.Morgan - Toiyabea alpina (L.C.Anderson & Goodrich) R.P.Roberts, Urbatsch & Neubig
 Tonestus kingii (D.C.Eaton) G.L.Nesom - Herrickia kingii (D.C.Eaton) Brouillet, Urbatsch & R.P.Roberts
 Tonestus microcephalus (Cronquist) G.L.Nesom & D.R.Morgan - Lorandersonia microcephala (Cronquist) Urbatsch, R.P.Roberts & Neubig
 Tonestus peirsonii (D.D.Keck) G.L.Nesom & D.R.Morgan - Lorandersonia peirsonii (D.D.Keck) Urbatsch, R.P.Roberts & Neubig

References

Astereae
Asteraceae genera
Flora of Western Canada
Flora of the Western United States
Taxa named by Aven Nelson